Kojo Acquah Yankah (born 16 August 1945) is a former Member of Parliament in Ghana. He also served as a Minister of State in the Rawlings government. He is the founder and President of the African University College of Communications and is also a former editor of the Daily Graphic, the widest circulation newspaper in Ghana.

Education
Kojo Yankah was born at Agona Duakwa in the Agona East District of the Central Region of Ghana. His primary education was in various schools in the Central Region. He attended Adisadel College for his secondary education. He then taught for a few years before proceeding to the University of Ghana, where he graduated with a Bachelor of Arts Honours degree in English.

Communications
After graduation, Yankah taught at the Adisadel College for two years. He worked with various government institutions, including the Information Services Department and the Social Security and National Insurance Trust. In 1982, after the Provisional National Defence Council military government came to power, he was appointed editor of the government-owned Daily Graphic newspaper which had the highest circulation in Ghana. He was later appointed Director of the Ghana Institute of Journalism.
In 2001, he established the Africa Institute of Journalism and Communications. This institution has now become the African University College of Communications, affiliated to the University of Ghana and with accreditation from the National Accreditation Board in March 2004.

Politics
With the return to party politics in Ghana, Yankah stood for elections as MP in the 1992 Ghanaian parliamentary election on the National Democratic Congress ticket and won the seat for the Agona East constituency. He retained the seat in the 1996 election to have a second term with 13,336 votes out of the 24,652 valid votes cast, representing 43.40% over his opponents: Yeboah Alex Duodo, an NPP member who polled 8,605 votes, Kweku James Mensah, an NCP member who polled 1,843 votes, Kofi Owusu, a CPP member who polled 470 votes, Martin Kobina Nkum, an NPP member who polled 389 votes and Kojo A. Yankah, an NPP member who also polled 0 votes. During the second term of the Rawlings government, Yankah was first appointed Central Regional Minister. He was later shifted to Ashanti Regional Minister, a position he held for only 11 months before he was moved to the National Development Planning Commission as a Minister of State. This led to his resignation from the government.

Family
Kojo Yankah married Susan Roseline Esi Thompson, a Home Economics tutor, in 1977. She died on 30 July 2001 from a respiratory ailment. He was married to Ekua Essandoh, now deceased.

He is the brother of Kwesi Yankah, who is the Minister of Tertiary Education in Government of Nana Akufo-Addo of the New Patriotic Party (NPP).

Publications
 
 
 Yankah, Kojo (1989).Dialogue with the North

References

External links
 Official website

Living people
1945 births
Ghanaian MPs 1993–1997
Ghanaian MPs 1997–2001
University of Ghana alumni
National Democratic Congress (Ghana) politicians
People from Central Region (Ghana)
Ghanaian editors
Alumni of Adisadel College